Pierre Maguelon (3 September 1933 – 10 July 2010) was a French actor.

Selected filmography

 Tire-au-flanc 62 (1960)
 The President (1961) - Un parlementaire (uncredited)
 Cartouche (1962) - Un complice de Cartouche (uncredited)
 The Suitor (1962) - Olympia's Stage Manager
 Le roi du village (1963)
 Bebert das Arábias (1963) - Perrin - le chef de gare de Gretz
 Monnaie de singe (1966) - Un co-détenu
 Un garçon, une fille. Le dix-septième ciel (1966) - (uncredited)
 Mise à sac (1967) - Le pompier Arthur
 Very Happy Alexander (1968) - Verglandier
 Love in the Night (1968)
 Le tatoué (1968) - Le détective #2
 The Milky Way (1969) - Le caporal de la Guardia Civil / Civil Guard Caporal
 Élise ou la vraie vie (1970) - Le chef d'équipe
 Bed and Board (1970) - L'ami de Césarin
 Law Breakers (1971) - Le gardien
 The Discreet Charm of the Bourgeoisie (1972) - Police Sergeant
 Beau Masque (1972) - Mignot
 France société anonyme (1974)
 The Tiger Brigades (1974, TV series) -  L'inspecteur Terrasson
 The Phantom of Liberty (1974) - Gérard, le gendarme / Policeman
 Vincent, François, Paul and the Others (1974) - Farina
 Le téléphone rose (1975) - Le patron de la brasserie
 Boomerang (1976) - L'inspecteur Léoni
 Le pays bleu (1977) - Clovis
 Et vive la liberté! (1978) - Le lieutenant
 Le pull-over rouge (1979) - L'inspecteur Commenci
 L'oeil du maître (1980) - Le patron du café
 A Bad Son (1980) - Le commissaire
 Garde à vue (1981) - Adami
 Cap Canaille (1983) - Varenne
 Julien Fontanes, magistrat (1985, TV Series) - André
 Le débutant (1986) - Gachassin
 Three Seats for the 26th (1988) - Marius Ceredo
 The Little Thief (1988) - Monsieur Fauvel
 Cyrano de Bergerac (1990) - Carbon de Castel-Jaloux
 Le provincial (1990) - Fernand Labadie
 My Father's Glory (1990) - François
 My Mother's Castle (1990) - François
 Triplex (1991) - Le gardien de prison optimiste
 Alice and Martin (1998) - Victor Sauvagnac
 Fin d'été (1999) - Roger

1933 births
2010 deaths
People from Tarn (department)
French male stage actors
French male film actors
French male television actors